The 2004 Carolina Challenge Cup was the first staging of the Carolina Challenge Cup, a preseason soccer tournament co-hosted by USL A-League side, Charleston Battery and USL Pro Soccer League club Wilmington Hammerheads. Held from March 20–March 28, the Cup featured two Major League Soccer clubs, one USL Pro Soccer League club, and one USL A-League club.

Columbus Crew of MLS won the inaugural tournament on goal differential over D.C. United.

Teams
Four clubs competed in the tournament:

Standings

Matches

Scorers
2 goals
Paul Conway (Charleston Battery)
Frankie Hejduk (Columbus Crew)
Chad Marshall (Columbus Crew)
1 goal
Freddy Adu (D.C. United)
Chris Bagley (Wilmington Hammerheads)
Bobby Convey (D.C. United)
Buddy Forward (Charleston Battery)
Ross Paule (D.C. United)
Jaime Moreno (D.C. United)

See also 
 Carolina Challenge Cup
 Charleston Battery
 2004 in American soccer

External links
 Carolina Challenge Cup release and schedule 

2004
2004 in American soccer
Carolina Challenge
March 2004 sports events in the United States